Events in the year 2022 in Iceland.

Incumbents 

 President: Guðni Th. Jóhannesson
 Prime Minister: Katrín Jakobsdóttir
 Althing: 2021-present Althing
 Speaker of the Althing: Birgir Ármannsson
 President of the Supreme Court: Karl Axelsson

Events 

 Ongoing — COVID-19 pandemic in Iceland
 4 February – Iceland announces it will end the practice of whaling by 2024, citing the decreasing price of whale meat.
 4 April – Icelandic journalists along with others from the European Union, Norway, Switzerland, and Liechtenstein from obtaining a visa in Russia by a simplified procedure.
 17 June – Iceland report their first case of Monkeypox.

Deaths 

 11 January– Arna Schram, journalist (b. 1968)
 21 January - Axel Nikulásson, basketball player (b. 1962)
 4 February - Dóra Ólafsdóttir, centenarian (b. 1912)
 23 March - Guðrún Helgadóttir, children's author and politician (b.1935)
 5 April - Bjarni Tryggvason, astronaut (b. 1945)
 7 April - Elias Davidsson, composer (b. 1941)
 1 July - Árni Gunnarsson, journalist and politician (b. 1940)
 17 August - Ingvar Gíslason, politician (b. 1926)
 17 September - Hrafn Jökulsson, writer and journalist (b.1965)

References 

 
2020s in Iceland
Years of the 21st century in Iceland
Iceland
Iceland